Cliff Edwards may refer to:
 Cliff Edwards (1895–1971), American singer and actor
 Cliff Edwards (footballer) (1921–1989), English footballer